The 1995 Auto Trader RAC British Touring Car Championship was won by John Cleland in a Vauxhall Cavalier. The Independents' title was won by Matt Neal in his Team Dynamics Ford Mondeo with fourteen class wins.

Team and Driver Information

All the race weekends were now double header meetings, with full points awarded at each race. The exception was the British Grand Prix support round.

Following the controversies over aerodynamic aids in 1994 first used by Alfa Romeo, TOCA announced wings and spoilers were eligible for all the cars in the new season.

After their domination in 1994, Alfa Corse went back to contesting the Italian Supertouring Championship, leaving Prodrive to run the works Alfa team. Derek Warwick was signed to drive alongside Giampiero Simoni with champion Gabriele Tarquini returning in a third car at Oulton Park. He replaced Simoni after the Silverstone Circuit GP support round but results continued to be disappointing and Alfa Romeo withdrew from the championship at the end of the year.

TWR Volvo replaced the 850 estate with the 850 saloon. The cars were instantly on the pace with Rickard Rydell winning round two and teammate Tim Harvey doubling up at the next round. Rydell remained in championship contention until the penultimate round, taking three more victories in the process whilst Harvey dropped back in the standings and at times was unconvincing compared to Rydell.

WilliamsF1 setup Williams Touring Car Engineering and took over development of Renault Laguna whilst Sodemo Moteurs supplied engines. 1994 runner up Alain Menu was retained and took more wins than any other driver during the season and he partnered by 1991 champion Will Hoy moving from Toyota. Towards the end of the year the Laguna was the class of the field, winning five of the last six races which helped Renault to take the manufacturers title for the first time.

Andy Rouse Engineering ran Ford's works effort for a third season with the V6 Mondeo. Double touring car world cup winner Paul Radisich was joined by British F3 championship winner Kelvin Burt. The car was competitive in the early part of the year but fell back in the development race. The powerful but heavy V6 contributed to major front tyre wear that saw the cars become mobile chicanes as races progressed. Radisich in particular struggled, scoring just 2 points in the final 10 races.

Vauxhall announced that the Cavalier was to be replaced by the new Vectra at the end of the season, so 1995 was the last hurrah for the venerable car. John Cleland was joined by James Thompson who replaced Jeff Allam, and despite the Volvo and Renault giving strong competition, Cleland's consistency and the Cavalier's reliability took the driver's and teams championships. Thompson crashed heavily during testing for the Knockhill Circuit round and injuries sustained would see him miss the remaining rounds. Jeff Allam was brought in as a last minute replacement for Knockhill and then Michael Briggs, the 1995 South African Touring Car Championship winner, for the rest of the season.

Team Schnitzer were heavily involved in other touring car championships around the world in 1995, with 1994 BTCC drivers Joachim Winkelhock competing in the German Supertouring championship which he won, while Steve Soper raced in Japan and took the title there. BMW instead employed it's UK arm to take on the challenge, with factory drivers Johnny Cecotto and David Brabham. The season was a disaster by BMWs standard however with no wins or even a podium finish to their credit.

Toyota retained Julian Bailey and Tim Sugden with Toyota Team Europe engineering the Carina with the backing of a major new sponsor, Mobil 1. Both drivers regularly ran near the higher end of the midfield and at Snetterton Circuit the team debuted a brand new right hand drive car, driven by Sugden, then Bailey for the remainder of the year. The new car was a significant step forward allowing Bailey to challenge the top 3 teams but it wasn't enough to stop Toyota pulling the plug at the end of the season.

Total Team Peugeot once again entered the Peugeot 405 Mi16, now in its final year. Patrick Watts remained with the team for a second season and he was joined by Simon Harrison the 1994 National Saloon Car Championship winner.  Harrison struggled, scoring points on just 4 occasions. Watts was more competitive, finishing on the podium twice.

Honda joined the championship with Motor Sport Developments entering the Accord driven by David Leslie and double independents champion James Kaye. Results steadily improved as the season progressed and Leslie in particular was able to mix it at the front of the pack, scoring a podium at Oulton Park.

In the Independents Championship, Matt Neal dominated the season and easily won his second Independent title driving a 1994 Andy Rouse Engineering built Ford Mondeo run by family outfit Team Dynamics. Mint Motorsport entered a 1993 Mondeo, also built by Andy Rouse engineering for Richard Kaye, making his BTCC debut and finishing second in the independent standings. Finishing third Nigel Smith competing in his second season, once again racing his 1993 Ecurie Ecosse Vauxhall Cavalier. Hamish Irvine finished fourth in his 1994 Peugeot 405. 1990 champion Robb Gravett entered the opening rounds at Donington Park in a 1993 Vauxhall Cavalier before returning at the Silverstone GP support race in an ex-STW Ford Mondeo. At Sneterton he scored the first outright podium finish for an independent driver in the 2 litre era. Australian Charlie Cox (racing) also entered a Ford Mondeo. A strategic tyre choice saw him take fifth overall at Brands Hatch in April. At the following round he was involved in a huge crash destroying the car and forcing him to miss a number of races. He returned at Brands Hatch in a rebuilt car, the first hatchback Mondeo to race in the UK.

Entry List

 Team Magic was entered for the season on the initial entry listing, but did not compete  due to budget issues.

Race calendar and winners
All races were held in the United Kingdom.

Results 
Points tables for the various titles as follows:

Drivers Championship 
Note: bold signifies pole position, italics signifies fastest lap.

Total Cup for Privateers

Manufacturers Championship

Teams Championship

References 

British Touring Car Championship seasons
Touring Car Championship